Armani was an ancient kingdom mentioned by Sargon of Akkad.

Location
Syria: Armani was mentioned alongside Ibla in the geographical treaties of Sargon. This led some historians to identify Ibla with Syrian Ebla and Armani with Syrian Armi. 

Mesopotamia: Michael C. Astour refused to identify Armani with Armi, as Naram-Sin makes it clear that the Ibla he sacked (in c. 2240 BC) was a border town of the land of Armani, while the Armi in the Eblaite tablets is a vassal to Ebla. Armani was attested in the treaties of Sargon in a section that mentions regions located in Assyria and Babylonia or territories adjacent to the east, in contrast to the Syrian Ebla, located in the west. The later King Adad-Nirari I of Assyria also mentions Armani as being located east of the Tigris and on the border between Assyria and Babylon. Historians who disagree with the identification of Akkadian Armani with Syrian Armi place it (along with Akkadian Ibla) north of the Hamrin Mountains in northern Iraq.

History

First mentioned as the land of Armani by Sargon. Naram-Sin boasted about his victory and destruction of the city or Amarnum. He gives a detailed account of the siege and the capture of Armarnum's king in one of his inscriptions.

Armanum was later mentioned amongst the cities that rebelled against Naram-Sin. During the Middle Assyrian and Kassite periods, the land of Armani was mentioned as located east of the Tigris. King Shalmaneser III mentions his conquest of Halman, but the identification of Halman with Akkadian Armani (Arman) is dubious according to J.A. Brinkmann.

References

Former populated places in Iraq
Former populated places in Syria
Former populated places in Turkey
Former populated places in Armenia
Ancient Near East